I Want to Live! is the debut film score composed, arranged and conducted by Johnny Mandel, for the 1958 film of the same name directed by Robert Wise. In addition to Mandel's score, the film features jazz themes performed by Gerry Mulligan's Jazz Combo. Two soundtrack albums were released on the United Artists label in 1958. Mandel was nominated for the Grammy Award for Best Sound Track Album or Recording of Original Cast From a Motion Picture or Television at the inaugural 1st Annual Grammy Awards in 1959; he lost to André Previn's score for Gigi.

Reception
Allmusic's Stephen Cook noted, "Johnny Mandel's I Want to Live soundtrack works both as high-end mood music and swinging jazz. ...the most intriguing cuts are those that seamlessly combine jazz, Latin percussion, and strains of Max Steiner's dramatically moody soundtracks ...And as far as murky ambience goes, he delivers some of the best (next to Mancini) ...To help navigate the vast terrain, Mandel enlists a cadre of top West Coast players like trumpeter Jack Sheldon, trombonist Frank Rosolino, reed player Bill Holman, bassist Red Mitchell, and drummer Shelly Manne. And topping off Mandel's original score, ... Gerry Mulligan and Art Farmer's combo interpretations of a handful of Mandel's original themes from the movie (Mulligan and company appear in the movie's bar scenes). One of the best jazz-inspired soundtracks around".

Track listingJohnny Mandel's Great Jazz Score: "Main Title" - 1:21
 "Poker Game" - 1:36
 "San Diego Party" - 4:08
 "Henry Leaves" - 1:39
 "Stakeout" - 4:01
 "Barbara Surrenders" - 2:05
 "Trio Convicted" - 1:11
 "Trip to Corona" - 1:28
 "Peg's Visit" - 2:36
 "Gas Chamber Unveiling" - 1:03
 "Nightmare Sequence" - 1:08
 "Preparations for Execution" - 2:50
 "Letter Writing Sequence" - 1:25
 "The Last Mile" - 1:48
 "Death Scene" - 1:04
 "End Title" - 0:56The Jazz Combo from I Want to Live!: "Black Nightgown" - 3:33
 "Theme from "I Want to Live"" - 6:54
 "Night Watch" - 3:55
 "Frisco Club" - 4:43
 "Barbara's Theme" - 4:39
 "Life's a Funny Thing" - 7:44

PersonnelJohnny Mandel's Great Jazz Score:Al Porcino, Ed Leddy, Jack Sheldon - trumpet
Frank Rosolino, Milt Bernhart - trombone
Dave Wells - trombone, bass trumpet
John Cave, Dick Parisi, Sinclair Lott, Vincent DeRosa - French horn
Harry Klee - flute, piccolo
Abe Most - clarinet
Joe Maini - alto saxophone, bass clarinet
Bill Holman - tenor saxophone, clarinet
Gerry Mulligan - baritone saxophone
Marty Berman - bass clarinet, contrabassoon
Chuck Gentry - bass saxophone, contrabass clarinet
Al Hendricksen - guitar
Kathryn Julye - harp
Pete Jolly - piano
Red Mitchell - bass 
Shelly Manne  - drums, percussion
Larry Bunker, Mel Lewis, Mike Pacheco, Milt Holland - percussion
Johnny Mandel - arranger, conductorOn The Jazz Combo from I Want to Live!:'''''
Gerry Mulligan - baritone saxophone
Art Farmer - trumpet
Frank Rosolino - trombone
Bud Shank - alto saxophone, flute
Pete Jolly - piano
Red Mitchell - bass 
Shelly Manne - drums
Johnny Mandel - arranger

References

1958 soundtrack albums
Film scores
Albums arranged by Johnny Mandel
Albums conducted by Johnny Mandel
United Artists Records soundtracks